João de Souza (born 28 August 1973) is an Angolan judoka. He competed in the men's half-middleweight event at the 1992 Summer Olympics.

References

External links
 

1973 births
Living people
Angolan male judoka
Olympic judoka of Angola
Judoka at the 1992 Summer Olympics
Place of birth missing (living people)